Man and Boy is a 1971 American western film directed by E.W. Swackhamer and starring Bill Cosby.

Plot
In the wake of the American Civil War, an ex-soldier and his family move west to settle in lawless Arizona.

Cast
 Bill Cosby as Caleb Revers
 Gloria Foster as Ivy
 Leif Erickson as Mossman
 George Spell as Billy
 Douglas Turner Ward as Christmas
 John Anderson as Stretch
 Henry Silva as Caine
 Dub Taylor as Atkins
 Yaphet Kotto as Nate 
 Shelley Morrison as Rosita
 Richard Bull as Thornhill
 Robert Lawson as Lawson
 Jason Clark as "Red"
 Fred Graham as himself
 Jack Owens as himself

Music 
The music was supervised by Quincy Jones and features vocals by Bill Withers.

See also
 List of American films of 1971

References

External links
 

1971 films
1970s adventure drama films
American adventure drama films
Films set in Arizona
Films set in the 1860s
Columbia Pictures films
1971 Western (genre) films
1971 drama films
1970s English-language films
1970s American films
American Western (genre) films